Meljski Hrib is a settlement on a small hill northeast of Maribor in northeastern Slovenia. It belongs to the City Municipality of Maribor.

Archaeological finds in the area with artifacts dating to prehistory and Roman pot sherds point to the continuous settlement of the area.

References

External links

Meljski Hrib on Geopedia

Populated places in the City Municipality of Maribor